Dracaena aurea, the golden hala pepe, is a species of flowering plant that is endemic to the island of Kauai in Hawaii.

It was first described by Horace Mann Jr. as Dracaena aurea in 1867. In 1914, N. E. Brown moved it to the genus Pleomele. The World Checklist of Selected Plant Families rejects the move.

References

External links

aurea
Endemic flora of Hawaii
Biota of Kauai
Trees of Hawaii
Plants described in 1867
Taxa named by Horace Mann Jr.
Flora without expected TNC conservation status